David Michael Bartley (born February 9, 1935, in Holyoke, Massachusetts) is a U.S. politician and educator who served as a member of the Massachusetts House of Representatives from 1963 to 1975, Speaker of the Massachusetts House of Representatives from 1969 to 1975, Secretary of Administration and Finance from 1981 to 1983, and President of Holyoke Community College from 1975 to 2004. In 1974, along with J. John Fox, he co-sponsored the Bartley-Fox law, which passed that year and took effect on April 1, 1975. The law forces judges to sentence people convicted of carrying a gun without a firearm identification card to at least one year in jail.

He ran for the United States Senate in 1984, finishing third in the Democratic primary behind Lieutenant Governor John Kerry and 5th congressional district representative James Shannon.

See also
 1969-1970 Massachusetts legislature
 1971–1972 Massachusetts legislature
 1973–1974 Massachusetts legislature

References

Bibliography
 The Springfield Republican, HCC ceremony Monday, (December 8, 2006 ).

1935 births
University of Massachusetts Amherst College of Education alumni
Politicians from Holyoke, Massachusetts
Speakers of the Massachusetts House of Representatives
Democratic Party members of the Massachusetts House of Representatives
Massachusetts Secretaries of Administration and Finance
Living people